Leland Chris Nielsen (June 14, 1919 – September 23, 1999) was a United States district judge of the United States District Court for the Southern District of California.

Education and career

Born in Vesper, Kansas, Nielsen received an Artium Baccalaureus degree from Washburn College in 1941 and was in the United States Army Air Corps during World War II, from 1941 to 1946, achieving the rank of Major. He received a Juris Doctor from the USC Gould School of Law in 1946. He was in private practice in Los Angeles, California from 1946 to 1947. He was a deputy city attorney of Los Angeles from 1947 to 1951. He was in private practice in San Diego, California from 1951 to 1968. He was a judge of the Superior Court of California for San Diego County from 1968 to 1971.

Federal judicial service

Nielsen was nominated by President Richard Nixon on April 21, 1971, to the United States District Court for the Southern District of California, to a new seat created by 84 Stat. 294. He was confirmed by the United States Senate on May 20, 1971, and received his commission the same day. He assumed senior status on June 14, 1985. Nielsen served in that capacity until his death on September 23, 1999.

References

Sources
 

1919 births
1999 deaths
Judges of the United States District Court for the Southern District of California
United States district court judges appointed by Richard Nixon
20th-century American judges
USC Gould School of Law alumni
People from Lincoln County, Kansas